Taiwanese Phonetic Symbols (TPS: ㄉㄞˊ ㆣ丨ˋ ㄏㆲ 丨ㆬ ㄏㄨˊ ㄏㄜ˫) constitute a system of phonetic notation for the transcription of Taiwanese languages, especially Taiwanese Hokkien. The system was designed by Professor Chu Chao-hsiang, a member of the National Languages Committee in Taiwan, in 1946. The system is derived from Mandarin Phonetic Symbols by creating additional symbols for the sounds that do not appear in Mandarin phonology. It is one of the phonetic notation systems officially promoted by Taiwan's Ministry of Education.

Symbols 
There are 49 symbols used in standard Taiwanese Hokkien. Of these 49 symbols, 26 are from the original Mandarin Phonetic Symbols, while 23 are additional, created for Taiwanese languages.

 The symbols in blue do not exist in Mandarin phonology.
 Four voiceless consonants ㄅ, ㄉ, ㄍ, ㄏ may be written in small form to represent the unreleased coda, as in ㆴ [p̚ ], ㆵ [t̚ ], ㆶ [k̚ ], ㆷ [ʔ]. However, due to technical errors, the coda symbol for ㄍ was mistaken as ㄎ. Unicode encoded ㆻ (31BB) in its version 13.0, and added a note under ㆶ (31B6), indicating 31BB is preferred.
 Some extra symbols are used in other Taiwanese dialects: ㄬ[ɲ], ㄛ [o], ㄝ [ɛ], ㆨ [ɨ].

Images
Images below are a collection of Taiwanese Phonetic Symbols:

For Taiwanese Hakka only: , 
 represents [x] in Standard Chinese and [h] in Taiwanese Hokkien and Taiwanese Hakka.
/ represent [ɛ]/[e] in Taiwanese Hokkien respectively, but they represent [e]/[ɛ] in Taiwanese Hakka.

Etymology

Other features

Combined rhymes

Tones

Example

Note: 恬恬 is Taiwanese Hokkien (台灣話). Synonyms would be 安靜 or 靜靜. 先生, in this context, means "teacher".

Unicode support 

The Mandarin Phonetic Symbols were added to the Unicode Standard in October 1991 with the release of version 1.0. The Unicode block for Mandarin Phonetic Symbols is U+3100 ... U+312F.

The extended phonetic symbols were added to the Unicode Standard in September 1999 with the release of version 3.0. The Unicode block for the extended symbols is U+31A0 ... U+31BF. Four symbols for Cantonese and one for Minnan and Hakka coda were released in 2020 with the publication of version 13.0. One can learn more information from the proposals.

Font support
The Academia Sinica of Taiwan has released three sets of fonts for Taiwanese Hokkien: "吳守禮標楷台語注音字型", "吳守禮細明台語注音字型", and "吳守禮台語注音字型". When the above fonts are used (to Chinese characters), the Bopomofo Phonetic Symbols will automatically appear. For words with more than one pronunciation, user can choose "破音" fonts to find the desired pronunciation. The user manual can be downloaded here.

See also 
 Taiwanese Hokkien
 Written Hokkien
 Pe̍h-ōe-jī
 Taiwanese Romanization System
 Taiwanese kana
 Bopomofo

References

External links 
 教育部方音符號系統
吳守禮, 吳昭新. "華、台語注音符號總表"
吳守禮, 吳昭新. "台語七種拼音法對照表"
吳昭新. "台語注音符號二式"

Writing systems introduced in 1946
Transcription of Chinese
Hokkien writing system
1946 establishments in Taiwan